The 1996 European Grand Prix was a Formula One motor race held at the Nürburgring in Germany on 28 April 1996. It was the fourth race of the 1996 Formula One World Championship.

The 67-lap race was won by Jacques Villeneuve, driving a Williams-Renault. Villeneuve beat teammate and pole-sitter Damon Hill off the line and led all 67 laps, taking his first F1 victory in only his fourth race. Local driver Michael Schumacher finished second in a Ferrari, with David Coulthard third in a McLaren-Mercedes, just ahead of Hill.

Both Benetton cars made extremely slow starts, due to the brakes locking on. Berger was forced to pit for fresh tyres after a flat-spot was caused, while Alesi finished lap 1 in 13th place and spun while trying to recover.

The Tyrrells were disqualified for separate infringements - Salo finished 10th but his car was found post-race to be underweight, while Katayama finished 12th but was disqualified for receiving an illegal push-start on the parade lap.

Classification

Qualifying

Race

Notes

Both of Mika Häkkinen's pit lane speeding penalties in this race were caused by a problem with his pit speed limiter.

Championship standings after the race

Drivers' Championship standings

Constructors' Championship standings

References

European Grand Prix
European Grand Prix
European Grand Prix
Sport in Rhineland-Palatinate
European Grand Prix